Luciano Erba (18 September 1922 – 3 August 2010) was an Italian poet, literary critic and translator.

Life and career 
Born in Milan, in 1947 Erba graduated in French literature at the Università Cattolica del Sacro Cuore. A member of the so-called "Linea Lombarda" movement, he debuted as a poet in 1951 with the collection Linea K.; his style was characterized from a realistic and everyday approach which was at the same time also metaphoric and hermetic.

During his career Erba was the recipient of numerous award, including the Viareggio Prize for Poetry in 1980 for   Il prato piu verde and Il nastro di Moebius, the Bagutta Prize in 1988 for II tranviere metafisico, the PEN Award in 1995 for L'ipotesi circense.

Erba was lecturer in several universities, including his alma mater. He collaborated as a literary critic to various publications, including  Itinerari, La Fiera Letteraria, Il Verri and The Western Review, and was active as a translator from French and English languages.

References

External links
Luciano Erba on Enciclopedia Treccani
 Peter Sirr (October 28, 2009). The Metaphysical Tramdriver: Reading Luciano Erba. The Cat Flap.

1922 births
2010 deaths
Writers from Milan
Viareggio Prize winners
20th-century Italian poets
21st-century Italian poets
21st-century Italian male writers
Italian male poets
Università Cattolica del Sacro Cuore alumni
Academic staff of the Università Cattolica del Sacro Cuore
Italian literary critics
20th-century Italian male writers
Italian male non-fiction writers
20th-century Italian translators